No. 533 Squadron RAF was one of the ten Turbinlite nightfighter squadrons of the Royal Air Force during the Second World War.

History
No. 533 Squadron was formed at RAF Charmy Down, Somerset on 8 September 1942, from No. 1454 (Turbinlite) Flight, as part of No. 10 Group RAF in Fighter Command. Instead of operating only Turbinlite and – rudimentary – Airborne Intercept (AI) radar-equipped aircraft (Havocs and Bostons) and working together with a normal nightfighter unit, such as in their case with the Hawker Hurricanes of No. 87 Squadron RAF in the Flight, the unit now also flew with their own Hurricanes. It was disbanded at Charmy Down on 25 January 1943, when Turbinlite squadrons were, due to lack of success on their part and the rapid development of AI radar, thought to be superfluous.

Aircraft operated

Squadron bases

Commanding officers

References

Notes

Bibliography

Further reading
 
 .

External links
 Squadron.cfm 533 Squadron history on MOD site
 No. 533 Squadron RAF movement and equipment history
 Squadron histories for nos. 521–540 squadron on RafWeb's Air of Authority – A History of RAF Organisation

533 Squadron
Military units and formations established in 1942
Military units and formations disestablished in 1943